The 1906 Clemson Tigers football team represented Clemson Agricultural College—now known as Clemson University—during the 1906 Southern Intercollegiate Athletic Association football season. Under first-year head coach Bob Williams, the team posted a 4–0–3 overall record with a mark of 4–0 in SIAA play. Fritz Furtick was the team captain.

Heralding one of the best defenses in the South for the season, the Tigers allowed no touchdowns scored by their opponents in seven games, and only four points scored overall. The team tied with Vanderbilt for the SIAA title, but few writers chose them over the vaunted Commodores.

Schedule

Games summaries

Davidson
In Davidson, Clemson had its third scoreless tie of the season.

Georgia Tech
Clemson closed the season with a 10–0 victory over John Heisman's Georgia Tech team. Fritz Furtick scored Clemson's first touchdown. An onside kick got the second.

Clemson's first forward pass took place during the game. Left end Powell Lykes, dropped back to kick, but lobbed a 30-yard pass to George Warren instead. Baseball star Ty Cobb attended the game.

The starting line up was Coagman (left end), Lykes (left tackle), Gaston (left guard), Clark (center), Carter (right guard), McLaurin (right tackle), Coles (right end), Warren (quarterback), Allen (left halfback), Furtick (right halfback), Derrick (fullback).

Players

Line

Backfield

References

Bibliography
 
 

Clemson
Clemson Tigers football seasons
College football undefeated seasons
Clemson Tigers football